The fifth season of Charmed, an American supernatural drama television series created by Constance M. Burge, originally aired in the United States on The WB from September 22, 2002 through May 11, 2003. Airing on Sundays at 8:00 pm. Paramount Home Entertainment released the complete fifth season in a six-disc box set on June 6, 2006.

Cast and Characters

Main 
 Alyssa Milano as Phoebe Halliwell
 Rose McGowan as Paige Matthews
 Holly Marie Combs as Piper Halliwell
 Brian Krause as Leo Wyatt
 Julian McMahon as Cole Turner
 Dorian Gregory as Darryl Morris

Recurring 
 Jennifer Rhodes as Penny Halliwell
 James Read as Victor Bennett
 Finola Hughes as Patty Halliwell
 Rebecca Balding as Elise Rothman
 Sandra Prosper as Sheila Morris
 Eric Dane as Jason Dean

Guest 
 Jaime Pressly as Mylie
 Nancy O'Dell as herself
 Sean Patrick Flanery as Adam Prinze
 Melinda Clarke as The Siren
 Mark. A. Sheppard as Arnon
 Tobin Bell as Orin
 Emmanuelle Vaugier as Dr. Ava Nicolae
 Billy Drago as Barbas, the Demon of Fear
Scott Jaeck as Sam Wilder
 Ken Marino as Miles
 Tony Todd as The Avatar of Force
 Joel Swetow as Alpha
 Adrian Paul as Jeric
 Erik King as Dex
 Henry Gibson as Sandman
 Austin Peck as Ryder
 Richard Lynch as Cronyn
 W. Morgan Sheppard as Merrill
 J.P. Manoux as Stanley
 Cheryl Ladd as Doris Bennett
 Grace Zabriskie as The Crone
 Dominic Fumusa as Saleel
 Zachary Quinto (uncredited) as Familiar Hunter
 Norman Reedus as Nate Park
 Chris Sarandon as The Necromancer
 Lee Arenberg as Unidentified Demon
 Cork Hubbert as Finnegan
 Drew Fuller as Chris Perry Halliwell

Special Appearance by
Pat Benatar & Neil Giraldo as Themselves

Special Musical Guest
The Flaming Lips
Michelle Branch
Beth Orton
Loudermilk

Episodes

Notes

References

External links 
   
 

Charmed (TV series)
Charmed (TV series) episodes
2002 American television seasons
2003 American television seasons
Mermaids in television